Swan Boats were an attraction at the Magic Kingdom at Walt Disney World. It was in operation between May 20, 1973 till August 1983. It originally took a D ticket.

The Swan Boats officially opened in 1973 and quickly became a popular attraction at Magic Kingdom.  The boats took guests on a ride around the hub of the Magic Kingdom and the Swiss Family Treehouse.

History 

Originally there were 12 boats when the ride opened, but this was reduced to 11 when one of the boats was converted to clean the canals.  By the end of the rides operation, there were only 5 boats operating.  The reason for closing was because of the cost to keep the boats running.  They constantly had issues with their natural gas engines and guidance system.  Originally the guidance was done with an electronic system but was changed to use water propulsion to turn the boat.  Eventually the boats were removed and sold.

See also
Magic Kingdom attraction and entertainment history

References

Former Walt Disney Parks and Resorts attractions
Amusement rides that closed in 1983
Magic Kingdom
1973 establishments in Florida
1983 disestablishments in Florida